Basutodon was a genus of suchian archosaur from the late Carnian-early Norian-age Upper Triassic Lower Elliot Formation of Lesotho. It is based on teeth that were once confused with prosauropod remains, as with Teratosaurus. Because of this, it is sometimes listed in older dinosaur books as an early theropod, or as a synonym of Euskelosaurus. It was probably neither of these things, though, and is much more likely to be a dubious non-dinosaur.

References

Prehistoric pseudosuchian genera
Prehistoric archosauriforms
Late Triassic reptiles of Africa
Taxa named by Friedrich von Huene
Fossil taxa described in 1932